Glinsk may refer to:

Places

Ireland 
Glinsk, County Mayo, a townland in Kilcommon civil parish in County Mayo
Glinsk, a 304 m mountain in the foregoing Glinsk townland in County Mayo
Glinsk, a townland in Aughagower civil parish in County Mayo
Glinsk, County Galway, a village in Glinsk townland in Ballynakill civil parish in County Galway
Glinsk, a townland in Ballynakill civil parish in County Galway
Glinsk, a townland in Moyrus civil parish in County Galway
Glinsk, a townland in Clondavaddog civil parish in County Donegal
Castletown and Glinsk, a townland in Kinnitty civil parish in County Offaly

Poland 
Glińsk, a village in western Poland

Ukraine 
Glinsk Hermitage, formally known as the Nativity of the Theotokos Male Stavropegial Monastery, a Russian Orthodox monastery

See also
Gleensk, a townland in Killinane parish in County Kerry, Republic of Ireland
Glinch, a townland in Aghabog parish in County Monaghan, Republic of Ireland